This is a timeline of artists, albums, and events in progressive rock and its subgenres.  This article contains the timeline for the period 2000 - 2009.

Contents
2000 - 2001 - 2002 - 2003 - 2004 - 2005 - 2006 - 2007 - 2008 -
2009

 See also
 Further reading


2000

Newly formed bands 
 Between The Buried And Me
 Daedalus
 Electric Light Orchestra (reformed line-up; only Jeff Lynne and Richard Tandy return from original line-up)
 Planet X
 The Orchestra (formed from remaining members of Electric Light Orchestra Part II, and not affiliated with Electric Light Orchestra listed above)
 Von Hertzen Brothers

Albums

Disbandments
 Electric Light Orchestra Part II

Events
 Billy Sherwood left and Igor Khoroshev was fired from Yes. This left Yes for the first time in its history without a full-time keyboardist.
 Little Tragedies grew from a three piece band to five.

2001

Newly formed bands 
 Beardfish
 EXIT project
 The Mars Volta
 Coheed & Cambria

Albums

Disbandments
 Death
 Electric Light Orchestra

Events
 Dream Theater released Live Scenes from New York on September 11, 2001 which made headlines because the album's artwork had an image of the New York City skyline in flames, including a depiction of the World Trade Center. The terrorist attack on the World Trade Center occurred the same day. The album was recalled and a new version was released. The original artwork is now a rare collectible.
 Russian Prog Rock festival InProg took place for the first time.
 Chuck Schuldiner, the frontman of Death, died from brain cancer.

2002

Newly formed bands 
 Protest The Hero
 Mechanical Poet
 Pig Farm On The Moon
 Riverside
 a.P.A.t.T.

Albums

Disbandments
 Transatlantic - Neal Morse announced his departure from "mainstream music". Transatlantic would reform with the same line-up in 2009.
After the "One More for the Road" tour, Supertramp goes on hiatus once again.

Events
 Rick Wakeman re-joined Yes.
 Having grown in popularity since its inception in 1999, NEARfest relocated to Trenton, New Jersey for the next two years to a venue that seats 1,850.
 Neal Morse, the frontman and primary contributor for Spock's Beard, embraced Christianity and left the band. He would later pursue a solo career producing progressive rock albums as well as occasional folk and worship albums. Spock's Beard continued on with drummer Nick D'Virgilio taking on lead vocal/frontman duties.
 First Progman Cometh Music Festival in Seattle
 Rush released Vapor Trails, their first album since 1996's Test For Echo. The band had been on hiatus after the death of drummer Neil Peart's daughter in 1997, and wife in 1998.
 Former Camel keyboardist Peter Bardens died.
 Drummer Chris Maitland left Porcupine Tree.

2003

Newly formed bands 
 Pure Reason Revolution
 Black Bonzo
 Moon Safari
 OSI
 AraPacis

Albums

Disbandments
 Ark

Events
 InProg takes place for the second time.
 The Mars Volta forms out of the punk group At the Drive-In and releases their first full studio album De-Loused in the Comatorium. The album mixes elements of prog, post-rock, punk, Latin, and jazz. The release is very successful and becomes an example of progressive rock success in the mainstream.    
 Second Progman Cometh Music Festival in Seattle
 Robert Fripp and King Crimson release The Power to Believe, their first studio album since 2000. 
 The Tangent is formed and releases their first album The Music That Died Alone. The initial lineup of this "supergroup" consisted of Andy Tillison & Sam Baine (Parallel Or 90 Degrees), Roine Stolt, Jonas Reingold, & Zoltan Czsorz (The Flower Kings), David Jackson (Van der Graaf Generator), and Guy Manning (Manning). It featured the epic track The Canterbury Sequence, which was an homage to the Canterbury scene of the 1970s. 
 Los Jaivas Frontman/Guitarist/Vocalist Eduardo "Gato" Alquinta, Died of a Heart Attack.

2004

Newly formed bands 
 Janvs
 Tinyfish (England)
 Sanctuary Rig (England)
 FromUz (Uzbekistan)

reformed bands 
 Van Der Graaf Generator

Albums

Disbandments

Events
 Anton Kochurkin and Michail "Kotovsky" Finagin leave EXIT Project.
 InProg 2004.
 Mel Pritchard, original drummer with Barclay James Harvest, dies of a heart attack.
 French 70s Zeuhl pioneers Magma release K.A (Köhntarkösz Anteria), a long anticipated follow-up album containing material written in the 1970s. 
 Happy the Man, a popular 70s American group who had reunited a few years earlier, release their first recorded studio album in 25 years titled The Muse Awakens. 
 Rush celebrated their 30th anniversary, along with releasing an 8-track cover EP titled Feedback.
 Yuri Alaverdyan, the guitarist of Disen Gage, leaves the band and is replaced by Sergey Bagin.
 Former members Derek Sherinian and Charlie Dominici join Dream Theater on stage to commemorate the 15th anniversary of "When Dream and Day Unite"

2005

Newly formed bands 
 Deluge Grander (U.S.A.)
 Dominici (U.S.A.)
 Outlaws of Ravenhurst (Canada)
 Qelbanix - Albania
 We Are The Music Makers (U.S.A.)
 Solarys (Lisbon, Portugal), http://solarys.pt.vu, formerly Project W.I.L.L. (1999–2004)

Albums

Events
 1970s progressive rock legends Van der Graaf Generator reunite and release a double CD titled Present which contained strong lyrical content and an entire disc of improvisations. 
 InProg turned into a two-day international festival.
 Kino, a new progressive rock supergroup consisting of members from Porcupine Tree, Arena, Marillion, and It Bites is formed. They release their first album, Picture in 2005. 
 Pink Floyd members David Gilmour, Nick Mason, and Richard Wright reunite with Roger Waters, the leading creative force of the band during its 1970s heyday, at Live 8 on July 2 in Hyde Park, England. Waters had acrimoniously left the band in 1985, and the quartet had last played together during a performance of The Wall in 1981.
 Former Gong drummer Pierre Moerlen died.
 Yugoslav band Na Lepem Prijazni reunites after 24 years.

2006

Newly formed bands 
 American Flag (US)
 Birds and Buildings (US)
 GPS
 Grand Tour (Scotland)
 Mother Military
 Pomme De Chien
 Proyecto Eskhata (Spain)
 Ride the Sky
 Thought Chamber
 Ved Buens Ende (reformed with previous line-up)

Albums

Disbandments

Events
 A combination of high-speed internet connections, MP3 compression, inexpensive streaming web servers, and the iPod/iTunes phenomenon has resulted in an explosion of internet radio stations devoted to playing progressive rock and other similar music. Some of these stations and radio programs have begun podcasting their programming, making it even more convenient to access music online. 
 Former Soft Machine member Elton Dean died.
 Former Pink Floyd member Syd Barrett died on July 7 due to diabetic related complications.
 Former Hatfield and the North/National Health drummer Pip Pyle died in August.
 Josh Eppard and Michael Todd, the drummer and bassist respectively for Coheed & Cambria left the group for personal reasons. Eppard was replaced with Chris Pennie of The Dillinger Escape Plan fame, but Michael Todd returned to help finish recording their next album.
 Genesis announced plans to reunite for a reunion tour in 2007 with Phil Collins, Tony Banks and Mike Rutherford being augmented by Daryl Stuermer and Chester Thompson. Members Peter Gabriel and Steve Hackett would not take part.

2007

Newly formed bands 
 Animist
 Beggar's Loot
 Circa (formed 2006, announced March 2007)
 Dennis
 Distant Lights
 Fractal Dimension - Turkey (İstanbul)
 Haken - England
 Headspace
 Porn Sheep Hospital - Portugal
 Skyshroud Claim
 White Nurse Gene

Albums

Disbandments
 Ved Buens Ende (after less than a year back together)

Events
 Canadian rock band Rush streamed their lead single "Far Cry" from their official website a day before releasing it to terrestrial radio stations.
 UK Progressive Rock festival SummersEnd announces its second year after a successful first year at the Robin venue in Bilston, Wolverhampton, UK.
 1980s neo-progressive band Twelfth Night reunite for the first time since 1987 for sporadic live appearances.
 Muse were the first band to sell out the newly rebuilt Wembley Stadium, performing two nights there and filming the shows for their H.A.A.R.P live album and DVD.

2008

Newly formed bands 
 Demians (France)
 Traumatized (Korea Rep.)
 Octillian (Canada)
 Awake (Australia)
 Timeless Infamy (US)
 Ill Omen (Australia)
 Oh, Lenore! (Canada)

Albums

Disbandments

Events
 Progressive Nation 2008 takes place, featuring Dream Theater, Opeth, Between the Buried and Me, and 3.
 Liquid Tension Experiment goes on a 10th anniversary tour.
 Rush's first drummer John Rutsey dies. Rutsey played on Rush's debut album.
 Richard Wright, keyboardist for Pink Floyd, dies of complications due to cancer.
 Coheed and Cambria play Neverender, a series of four-night shows played from October to November in four cities.
 Jon Anderson is fired from Yes after being admitted to hospital and Rick Wakeman leaves due to health complications. They are replaced by Benoît David and Oliver Wakeman (Rick's son).
 Cardiacs frontman Tim Smith suffers a heart attack after attending a My Bloody Valentine gig, causing lifelong dystonia.

2009

Newly formed bands 
 Ashes Of Nothing (Slovenia)
 Sincara (Norway)
 Projected Twin (Australia)
 The Hopeful Calling (Canada)
 Intrepid (Canada)
 The Pepper Machine (France)
 The Muhittin Experience  (Turkey)
 Caterpillarmen (Iceland)
 Astra  (US)

Albums

Disbandments

Events
 Soft Machine bassist Hugh Hopper dies on June 7. 
 Progressive rock supergroup, Transatlantic, reunites in April with the original line-up (Neal Morse, Pete Trewavas, Roine Stolt, and Mike Portnoy).   They release their third studio album, The Whirlwind, in October and announce a 2010 world tour. 
 The Norwegian group Ark officially reunites and begin songwriting sessions for the third album.
 Original lead vocalist of Crimson Glory, Midnight, dies on June 8 of a stomach aneurysm.

See also
 Timeline of progressive rock: other decades: 1960s - 1970s - 1980s - 1990s - 2010s – 2020s
 Timeline of progressive rock (Parent article)
 Progressive rock
 Canterbury Scene
 Symphonic rock
 Avant-rock
 Rock in Opposition
 Neo-prog
 Progressive metal
 Jazz fusion

Further reading
 Lucky, Jerry.  The Progressive Rock Files Burlington, Ontario: Collector's Guide Publishing, Inc (1998), 304 pages,  (paperback).  Gives an overview of progressive rock's history as well as histories of the major and underground bands in the genre.
 Macan, Edward.  Rocking the Classics:  English Progressive Rock and the Counterculture. Oxford:  Oxford University Press (1997), 290 pages,  (hardcover),  (paperback).  Analyzes progressive rock using classical musicology and also sociology.

References

Timeline
Progressive rock
Progressive rock
Timeline of progressive rock
2000s in music
Music history by genre